Francesca Alexander (February 27, 1837 – January 21, 1917), born Esther Frances Alexander and also known as Fanny Alexander, was an American expatriate illustrator, author, folklorist, and translator.

Early life
She was born Esther Frances Alexander in Boston, Massachusetts. Her father was the portrait painter Francis Alexander  and her mother Lucia Grey Alexander (née Swett) was a philanthropist from a wealthy Massachusetts family. When she was 16, the family moved to Florence, Italy.

Career 

In Italy, Alexander's early artistic output was as part of her mother's charity work and she wrote about and drew portraits of poor Tuscan farmers as gifts for wealthy American donors to their cause. In the process, she became familiar with local folkways and customs, collecting songs and stories and translating them for publication.

In 1882 she was introduced to the English critic John Ruskin by a family friend. He was interested in her work, especially her simple, spiritual illustrations, and purchased two manuscripts from her for £600. The first was published in 1883 as The Story of Ida with its author listed simply as "Francesca." The volume went into several editions in both the United States and Great Britain.

Ruskin published her most celebrated work, Roadside Songs, in 1885. The book drew from the work of a celebrated story-teller, Beatrice Bernardi of Pian degli Ontani. It also contained a translation of a 17th-century ottava rima ballad with Italian original opposite the translated English stanzas. A third collection, Christ's Folk in the Apennines, was published in 1887-89.

After Ruskin's death Alexander published Tuscan Songs (1897) and The Hidden Servants and Other Very Old Stories Told Over (1900).

Alexander was blind and in poor health in her final years, and died in Florence on January 21, 1917.  She is buried in the Cimiterio degli Allori.

Selected illustrations

Selected writings 
 1883 The Story of Ida, John Ruskin, ed. Boston: Cupples, Upham.
 1884-85 Roadside Songs of Tuscany, Francesca Alexander, tr. and ill. John Ruskin, ed. 4 vols. New York: Wiley.
 1887-89 Christ's Folk In The Apennini. Reminiscences of Her Friends Among the Tuscan Peasantry. London: George Allen.
 1897 Tuscan Songs.
 1900 The Hidden Servants and Other Very Old Stories Told Over.

Legacy 
Francesca Alexander's papers are collected in the Boston Athenæum.  Correspondence between Alexander and Ruskin and letters from Alexander to Ruskin's cousin and heir Joan Severn are held by the Morgan Library.

Her book The Story of Ida inspired poems by James Russell Lowell and John Greenleaf Whittier

References

External links 
 The Ballad of Santa Zita, Francesca Alexander translation from Roadside Songs of Tuscany

1837 births
1917 deaths
Artists from Boston
19th-century American painters
20th-century American painters
Italian–English translators
American women illustrators
20th-century American women artists
19th-century American women artists
20th-century American translators
19th-century American translators
20th-century American women writers
Writers from Boston
19th-century American women writers
19th-century American writers
American expatriates in Italy
Literary translators